Achnaconeran is a remote crofting settlement in the Inverness committee area of Highland and is in the Scottish council area of Highland.

References

Populated places in Inverness committee area